Andy Sutcliffe (9 May 1947 – 13 July 2015) was a British racing driver from England.

Born in Mildenhall, Suffolk, Sutcliffe began his racing career in 1969. He competed in Formula Three from 1970 to 1973, before contesting the 1974 European Formula Two Championship, finishing tenth overall in a BMW-powered March 732 entered by Brian Lewis. He was entered for that year's Formula One British Grand Prix at Brands Hatch, in a Brabham BT42 run by the Italian Scuderia Finotto team, but did not appear.

In 1977, he was again entered for the British Grand Prix, this time at Silverstone, in a March 761 run by the RAM Racing team. He failed to pre-qualify.

He later worked at a nursery in Ashford, Kent and lived in Pluckley in Kent.

Racing record

Complete European Formula Two Championship results
(key) (Races in bold indicate pole position; races in italics indicate fastest lap)

Complete Formula One results
(key)

References

English racing drivers
English Formula One drivers
European Formula Two Championship drivers
1947 births
2015 deaths
People from Mildenhall, Suffolk
RAM Racing Formula One drivers
People from Pluckley